Pirwa Hirka (Quechua pirwa deposit, hirka mountain, "deposit mountain", hispanicized spelling Pirhua Jirca) is a mountain in the Andes of Peru, about  high. It is located in the Lima Region, Huaral Province, Pacaraos District, and in the Pasco Region, Pasco Province, Huayllay District. It lies west of a lake named Warunqucha.

References

Mountains of Peru
Mountains of Lima Region
Mountains of Pasco Region